Polidesportivo do Pedrocão is an indoor sporting arena located in Franca, Brazil. The capacity of the arena is 10,000.

Indoor arenas in Brazil
Sports venues in São Paulo (state)